The King Drinks or The Bean King may refer to one of ten surviving works of the same title by Jacob Jordaens:

The King Drinks (Brussels), one of two in that museum
The King Drinks (St. Petersburg)
Galerie Heim, Basel
Brunswick
Kassel
Chatsworth House
Paris (Louvre)
Lille
Valenciennes
Vienna (Kunsthistorisches Museum)

References 

Paintings by Jacob Jordaens
Paintings in the Louvre by Dutch, Flemish and German artists
Paintings in Kassel
Paintings in Lower Saxony
Paintings in the collection of the Kunsthistorisches Museum
Paintings in Basel
Collections of the Palais des Beaux-Arts de Lille
Paintings in the Devonshire Collection